Fudbalski klub Slavija Sarajevo (Serbian Cyrillic: Фудбалски клуб Славија Сарајево) is a professional association football club from the city of Istočno Sarajevo, Republika Srpska that is situated in Bosnia and Herzegovina. Slavija Sarajevo is a member of the Football Association of Republika Srpska and the Football Association of Bosnia and Herzegovina and it is active in the First League of the Republika Srpska. The club's home stadium is Gradski SRC Slavija Stadium, which has a capacity of 6,000 seats.

Dominantly the club of Serbs, Slavija was by far the most successful club from Bosnia and Herzegovina during the interbellum, having played 11 top league seasons (out of possible 16) in the Kingdom of Serbs, Croats and Slovenes and Kingdom of Yugoslavia.

History
Founded in Sarajevo during 1908 when the city was part of Austria-Hungary, the football club was part of the wider sports society of Sarajevo gymnasium students informally known as Đački sportski klub (ĐSK) or Srednjoškolski sportski klub (SSK). Since cultural and social activities in the city in those days mostly revolved around Hotel Evropa and the gymnasium, the idea of establishing a sporting club was initiated on those premises. Some of the students earlier that year visited Zagreb, where they got introduced to the game of football, bringing back the first ball to Sarajevo. Notable individuals who organized club activities in this early period were students Zdravko Jeftanović (son of the Hotel Evropa owner dr. Dušan Jeftanović), Feodor Lukač, Emil Najšul, Sveto Gerovac, Stevo Jokanović, etc. Their early activities were very sporadic and basically clandestine as Austro-Hungarian occupational authorities that just annexed Bosnia instituted a ban on any kind of organized gathering.

In early 1909, the football section got its first pairs of boots and started holding regular practices and training sessions at Sarajevo Polje grounds, more precisely the military workout open facility known as Egzercir in the Čengić vila area. Since the open field didn't have any goalposts, the students had to haul them in on foot from the city for every practice and match. ĐSK/SSK also informally took red and white as club colours after Slavia Prague, the club that served as inspiration for Slavs throughout Austria-Hungary. Austrian international striker, Karl Harmer, came from Vienna to become the team's first manager.

1910s
It wasn't until 1911 that ĐSK played its debut match, defeating a selection of Vienna soldiers 4–2.

Throughout 1912, ĐSK played friendlies in parts of Austria-Hungary populated by South Slavs. First such trip outside of Sarajevo was to the city of Split where ĐSK played local side Hajduk. The first match took place on 7 April 1912 and Hajduk won, 4–1. A day later on 8 April, the teams played another match with ĐSK winning this time, 2–1. Curiosity from the Split visit was that posters announcing the two matches around the city billed ĐSK as "Osman" for non-specified reasons. This probably stemmed from the fact that "ĐSK" as club name was informally used even amongst its players so the Split hosts decided to make up a name for their guests' club on the spot. They seemingly found the male Muslim name Osman to be sufficiently funny and decided to print it on the posters as the club's official name.

From the fall of 1912 as the first of eventually two Balkan Wars started raging nearby, just beyond the Austria-Hungary's eastern borders, ĐSK naturally began fostering Pan-Slavic sentiment, and especially the Yugoslav idea (unification of South Slavs), even harder as national and political aspects of club's activities came to the forefront. While the Balkan League member states (Serbia, Greece, Bulgaria, and Montenegro) were getting rid of the last remains of Ottoman influence, Slavs within the borders of Austria-Hungary were restless to make some dents in the armour of their own occupiers – the Austro-Hungarian empire. By mid-1913, the Balkan Wars were over with a resounding victory for Slavs (Serbs and Montenegrins) across the border on the other side of river Drina. This had an enormously encouraging effect on Slavs (especially Serbs) in Bosnia. Austro-Hungarian authorities were not oblivious to such developments and their repression got stepped up even further. All of this led to increased tensions and boiling pot atmosphere in the city of Sarajevo.

During the second part of 1913, an ethnic split occurred within the ĐSK organization as a certain number of members (all of them ethnic Croats) left ĐSK to form Hrvatski sportski klub, which later became SAŠK. However, most others stayed at the club and soon changed the ĐSK's name to Srpski sportski klub (SSK). The freshly renamed entity attempted to make its existence public and official, and to that end enlisted its connections through Dušan Jeftanović, a prominent local industrialist and landowner, and Jovo Šošić. However, Austro-Hungarian authorities wouldn't give an inch—the ban on organized gathering stayed firmly in place. The difficult situation that the club found itself in made its members pull together even harder and by the end of 1913 they built a home ground located at Čurčić Vila in Koševo neighbourhood. However, they wouldn't get to enjoy their new home for long.

The assassination of Archduke Franz Ferdinand by Gavrilo Princip in June 1914 set off a chain of events such as the Austrian July Ultimatum to Serbia, the subsequent Austro-Hungarian declaration of war on Serbia and the eventual outbreak of World War I. The position of Serbs in Bosnia became increasingly difficult. SSK members were no exception as many of them got arrested or forcibly conscripted to fight in the Austro-Hungarian Army. The newly built ground at Čurčić Vila got ransacked and burned by an angry mob of Croats and Bosniaks.

Football quickly became an afterthought and SSK was completely inactive all throughout World War I. After the end of war and the creation of Kingdom of Serbs, Croats and Slovenes, SSK reactivated in 1919.

1920s
In 1921, SSK changed its name to SK Slavija and competed in the top level of the Sarajevo Subassociation. Over the next few years Slavija built a 4,000-capacity stadium in Marijin Dvor area of Sarajevo. In line with its student background the club devoted its potential to developing young players.

Slavija's first appearance in the Kingdom's top football competition took place in 1924. It featured only seven clubs and was played in cup system. Slavija didn't have luck cause they got as opponents in the quarterfinal Belgrade's SK Jugoslavija, which crashed them 2–5 and later became champions that season.

1930s
The 1930 season saw the return to top flight that now featured six clubs and was played in league system. Slavija finished the season in 5th place with 2 wins, 2 draws, and 6 losses, all of which wasn't enough to avoid the drop.

Next chance for top flight football came in 1932–33 season. By then the competition changed format once more as it was now played in fall-spring league rhythm and expanded to 11 clubs. Slavija finished 9th in the league with 7 wins, 2 draws, and 11 losses, which was just enough to stay afloat.

Football was not played in Kingdom of Yugoslavia during 1933–34 season, so the next opportunity came in 1934–35. The league now featured 10 teams, and Slavija again barely avoided relegation, finishing third from the bottom with 7 wins, 1 draw, and 10 losses.

The 1935–36 season finally provided a much sought breakthrough for Slavija as the club came within a hair of becoming the champion of Yugoslavia. The top league now featured 14 clubs, most ever in its history up to that point. Another change was that the home-and-away cup system was brought back. Led by Milan Rajlić and Slavko Zagorac on the pitch, and Risto Šošić from the bench, Slavija first came up against Cetinje's Crnogorac, beating them 5–4 on aggregate. Next up was Građanski from Skopje in the quarter-finals – after losing the first game 1–2, Slavija recorded a famous 10–1 win in the return leg. This momentum carried into the semi-finals against Novi Sad's NAK as Slavija progressed 4–2 on aggregate. That set the stage for the famous two-legged final against the powerhouse BSK team. First leg finished 1–1, but BSK prevailed 0–1 in return.

The competition for the 1936–37 returned to 10 clubs and league system. Encouraged by their previous season's historic runner-up success, Slavija entered the new campaign with high hopes. They were soon dashed, however, as the club recorded 7 wins, 3 draws, and 8 losses, which was enough for a mid-table 5th-place finish.

The next season was virtually identical with 7 wins, 4 draws, and 7 losses that again translated to 5th place in the table. A small consolation was that this was the first time season played in the league system that Slavija didn't have more losses than wins.

In 1940, the club participated at the 1940 Mitropa Cup which ended up abandoned due to the beginning of the war. Slavija lost in the quarter-finals to Ferencvaros in a dramatic 11–1 comeback from the Hungarians in Budapest, after losing to Slavija by 3–0 in Sarajevo in the first round. Slavija was led by the notable Hungarian manager Wilmos Wilhelm.

Once again just like in World War I, following the Nazi Germany invasion of Kingdom of Yugoslavia the club was inactive until the end of World War II in the Balkans. After the war, SK Slavija was disbanded without any explanation by the new communist authorities. Its stadium at Marijin Dvor was renamed "Šesti april" and used for home matches of FK Željezničar and newly formed SD Torpedo. The stadium was eventually torn down while its stands and bleachers were given to FK Željezničar for use in their Grbavica ground that was under construction.

Rebirth
In 1993, after the break-up of SFR Yugoslavia and the formation of the Football Association of Republika Srpska, FK Slavija was re-formed. In 1996, because of its pre-war tradition, it was decided that the club would become part of the newly formed First League of Republika Srpska. Slavija finished eighth at the end of the season; however, because of the restructuring of the league system, they would compete in the Second League of Republika Srpska for the following seasons, returning in 2000. In that season, Slavija won the 1999–00 Second League of RS unbeatable, with 19 wins and 2 draws, and a 73–6 goal difference. Slavija played in the First League of RS until 2004 when they became league champions and earned promotion to the Premier League of Bosnia and Herzegovina. In 2004, the club reached the semi-finals of the Bosnian Cup for the third time.  Since then, the club has become a regular participant in the Premier League, having in between celebrated its centennial in 2008.

Supporters

The organized supporters of the club are known as Sokolovi (The Falcons).

Honours

Domestic

League
Yugoslav First League:
Runners-up (1): 1935–36
Premier League of Bosnia and Herzegovina:
Runners-up (1): 2008–09
First League of the Republika Srpska:
Winners (1): 2003–04

Cups
Bosnia and Herzegovina Cup:
Winners (1): 2008–09
Runners-up (1): 2006–07
Republika Srpska Cup:
Winners (2): 2005–06, 2007–08

European record

P = Matches played; W = Matches won; D = Matches drawn; L = Matches lost; GF = Goals for; GA = Goals against; GD = Goals difference. Defunct competitions indicated in italics.

List of matches

Players

Current squad

Notable former players
These players played in the club and have played in national teams:

Pre-1945 period:
 Karl Harmer
 Florijan Matekalo
 Milan Rajlić
 Branko Stanković
 Slavko Zagorac

Post-1945 period:
 Velibor Đurić
 Vlastimir Jovanović
 Ilija Prodanović
 Bojan Regoje
 Zoran Kokot
 Dai Lin
 Ostoja Stjepanović
 Dimitrije Injac
 Goran Trobok

Managers

 Karl Harmer (1908–1911)
 Toni Szabó (1924–19xx)
 Hans Ringer (1934–1935)
 Risto Šošić (1935–1937)
 Brana Porobić (1937–1938)
 Franz Unschuld (1938–1939)
 Walter Kolitsch (1939–1940)
 Vilmos Wilheim (1940)
 Nedeljko Bugarin
 Slobodan Lubura
 Zoran Šumar
 Bojan Miličević
 Duško Petrović
 Ranko Mrkajić
 Milomir Šešlija (20 March 2002 – 13 June 2003)
 Milomir Odović (3 June 2005 – 20 August 2007)
 Mirko Marvan (21 August 2007 – 7 April 2008)
 Zoran Erbez (8 April 2008 – 20 September 2009)
 Milomir Odović (21 September 2009 – 4 May 2010)
 Dušan Jevrić (5 May 2010 – 1 August 2010)
 Dragan Bjelica (7 August 2010 – 12 September 2011)
 Aleksandar Simić (interim) (12 September 2011 – 23 September 2011)
 Zoran Erbez (23 September 2011 – 1 January 2012)
 Milan Gutović (17 January 2012 – 20 March 2012)
 Vlado Čapljić (20 March 2012 – 29 November 2012)
 Milomir Šešlija (5 January 2013 – 6 July 2013)
 Dragan Radović (7 July 2013 – 31 October 2013)
 Slaviša Božičić (13 November 2013 – 31 March 2014)
 Milan Gutović (21 February 2015 – 11 August 2015)
 Darko Vojvodić (19 August 2015 – 8 December 2015)
 Veljko Dovedan (21 February 2016 – 22 March 2016)
 Milko Djurovski (30 March 2016 – 16 May 2016)
 Branislav Berjan (1 July 2016 – 19 September 2016)
 Milomir Odović (22 September 2016 – 28 May 2017)
 Dragan Radović (12 July 2017 – 2 April 2018)
 Dragan Bjelica (18 April 2018 – 11 November 2018)
 Milan Gutović (26 January 2019 – 1 June 2020) 
 Zoran Erbez (2 July 2020 – present)

References

External links

Official website 

FK Slavija Sarajevo
Football clubs in Bosnia and Herzegovina
Association football clubs established in 1908
Football clubs in Republika Srpska
Istočno Sarajevo
1908 establishments in Bosnia and Herzegovina